Frederick Carter (born 1835, date of death unknown) was a convict transported to Western Australia, later to become one of the colony's ex-convict school teachers.

Early life and transportation
Frederick Carter was born in 1835.  A gunsmith by trade, he had a lifelong interest in sports, especially horseracing, and he was an outstanding rider and trainer of horses.  In 1865, Carter was found guilty of a felony by the Birmingham courts, and sentenced to ten years' penal servitude.  The following year, he was transported to Western Australia on board the Corona, arriving in December 1866.

Career in Australia
After receiving his ticket of leave, Carter was employed as a servant of another ex-convict, Theodore Richards. Richards was a school teacher at Katrine school, and Carter was sometimes asked to assist with teaching.

In 1870, Carter took a teaching post at Seven Springs, near Newcastle, but attendance was poor and this affected his salary.  The following year he accepted a teaching appointment at Bejoording, where there was a regular attendance of around 25 pupils.  He remained there until 1874.  During that time he rode to Newcastle (now Toodyay) every weekend to help in a racing stables.  He also had a servant, and employed other ex-convicts to cut sandalwood.  Erickson (1983) writes that he was also an impressive hurdler: "Not for him the tedium of dismounting to let down the sliprails. He hurdled every gate and fence across his path".

In 1875, Carter accepted an appointment as school master at Gwalla (now Northampton).  The following year he moved again to Ludlow.

References
 

1835 births
Convicts transported to Western Australia
Settlers of Western Australia
Australian schoolteachers
Year of death unknown